Gavin Nisbet was a Scottish professional footballer who played as a wing half.

References

Scottish footballers
Association football wing halves
Preston North End F.C. players
Burnley F.C. players
Accrington Stanley F.C. (1891) players
Stalybridge Celtic F.C. players
English Football League players
Year of birth missing
Year of death missing
Footballers from Hamilton, South Lanarkshire